The Battle of Carthage was fought in 238 AD between a Roman army loyal to Emperor Maximinus Thrax and the forces of Emperors Gordian I and Gordian II.

Background
Gordian I and II were father and son, both supported by the Roman Senate and based in Africa Province. The battle was part of a rebellion against Emperor Maximinus Thrax started by landowners who felt they had been overly and unfairly taxed. These landowners assassinated the procurator in Thysdrus and called on Gordian I and his son Gordian II to be their emperors.

Capelianus was the governor of Numidia who had a previous grudge against Gordian I according to Herodian. Herodian says this grudge was developed after a lawsuit involving the two. Soon after being elected emperor, Gordian I sent a replacement to Numidia to replace his old enemy Capelianus. This action would eventually lead to his untimely demise.

The battle
Gordian I marched from Thysdrus to Carthage, where news of the rebellion was welcomed. Capelianus led the only legion in Africa, Legio III Augusta, in battle against the two emperors.

The two armies met near Carthage. Gordian II personally led his army, consisting of militiamen without military training: he was defeated and killed. Upon learning of his son's death, Gordian I committed suicide.

Lasting effects
With the death of the two Gordians the Roman senate elected two new emperors that were not popular with the public. The senate then decided to turn to the 13-year-old Gordian III to become the new Caesar.

References

Carthage 238
238
Carthage 238
230s in the Roman Empire